Witch Creek is a stream, and a tributary of Santa Ysabel Creek, in eastern San Diego County, California.

It flows northwestward down slope to the confluence with its North fork (that also has its source on Dye Mountain), then southwest to the community of Witch Creek. It then turns northwest at an elevation of 2720 feet, falling down Witch Creek Canyon to its confluence with Santa Ysabel Creek at an elevation of 2221 feet.

References

Rivers of San Diego County, California
Cuyamaca Mountains
Rivers of Southern California